Mäeküla may refer to several places in Estonia:

 Mäeküla, Hiiu County, village in Käina Parish, Hiiu County
 Mäeküla, Paide Parish, village in Paide Parish, Järva County
 Mäeküla, Türi Parish, village in Türi Parish, Järva County
 Mäeküla, Lääne County, village in Ridala Parish, Lääne County
 Mäeküla, Pärnu County, village in Halinga Parish, Pärnu County
 Mäeküla, Saare County, village in Orissaare Parish, Saare County
 Mäeküla, Tartu County, village in Kambja Parish, Tartu County
 Mäeküla, Valga County, village in Sangaste Parish, Valga County
 Mäeküla, Karksi Parish, village in Karksi Parish, Viljandi County
 Mäeküla, Suure-Jaani Parish, village in Suure-Jaani Parish, Viljandi County
 Mäeküla, Tallinn, subdistrict of Tallinn